Arthraxon hispidus, is a grass commonly known as small carpetgrass or hairy jointgrass. It is native to East Asia and was accidentally introduced to the United States, where it is considered an invasive species.

References

Andropogoneae
Flora of tropical Asia
Flora of temperate Asia
Flora of Africa